Nuacht24 (meaning "Twenty-four hour News") is an Irish language news website and weekly online newspaper with a weekly printed edition based in Belfast, Northern Ireland. It has been favourably received by Irish media as an independent, comprehensive, up-to-date news service. Nuacht24 launched a comprehensive video based service at www.nuacht24.com. It was founded by well-known journalist Eoghan Ó Néill.

See also
List of Irish-language media

References

External links
 Official site - Nuacht24

Newspapers published in Northern Ireland
Mass media in Belfast
Irish-language newspapers